Aulad is a 1954 Bollywood film directed by Mohan Segal. It stars Balraj Sahni, Nirupa Roy, Usha Kiran in lead roles.

Music
All music composed by Sardar Malik.

References

External links
 

1954 films
1950s Hindi-language films
Films scored by Sardar Malik
Indian black-and-white films
Indian drama films
1954 drama films